The Lincoln Imp is a grotesque on a wall inside Lincoln Cathedral, England, and it has become the symbol of the city of Lincoln. A legend tells of it being a creature sent to the cathedral by Satan, only to be turned into stone by an angel.

Legends
According to a 14th-century legend, two mischievous creatures called imps were sent by Satan to do evil work on Earth. After causing mayhem in Northern England, the two imps headed to Lincoln Cathedral, where they smashed tables and chairs and tripped up the Bishop. When an angel came out of a book of hymns and told them to stop, one of the imps was brave and started throwing rocks at the angel, but the other imp cowered under the broken tables and chairs. The angel turned the first imp to stone, giving the second imp a chance to escape.  It is said that even on still days it is always windy around the cathedral, which is the second imp circling the building looking for his friend.

There are many variations on Lincoln Imp legends. According to one popular legend, the imp which escaped fled north to Grimsby, where it soon began making trouble. It entered St. James' Church and began repeating its behaviour from Lincoln Cathedral. The angel reappeared and gave the imp's backside a good thrashing before turning it to stone as it had the first imp at Lincoln. The "Grimsby Imp" can still be seen in St James' Church, clinging to its sore bottom. Another legend has the escaped imp turned to stone just outside the cathedral, and sharp-eyed visitors can spot it on a South outside wall.

Lincoln College, Oxford 

An 1899 reproduction of the Lincoln Imp also overlooked the Front Quad of Lincoln College, Oxford until 2000 when it was transferred to the bar (Deep Hall) and another Imp was erected in the traditional position above the entrance to Hall. 

This has given rise to a traditional Oxford expression: 'to look on someone like the Imp looks over Lincoln' as well as giving rise to the title of the college's undergraduate newspaper: The Lincoln Imp. The Lincoln Imp is also the mascot of the college boat club, an image of which is used to decorate the oars and jerseys of the men's 1st VIII.

Wider use of the image 

The use of the figure is extremely widespread across both England and Scotland. It is hard to imagine that each image was aware of the Lincoln example. It must therefore be speculated that the form is a widespread image predating its use at Lincoln, and simply an everyday deity in the same mode as the "Green Man". In the 18th century it was a fairly popular door-knocker design.

The critical features of the form are: cloven feet; one leg raised so the foot rests on the other knee; both hands holding the raised leg; open mouth with buckteeth (there is a tooth gap); cow ears; horns; hairy body.

The Lincoln example is by far the best-known (and most public) example, hence the normal term "Lincoln Imp". Whilst most examples predate 1800 the term itself only seems to have become widespread at the end of the 19th century, presumably due to contemporary publicity regarding the cathedral's imp. James Ward Usher, local businessman and philanthropist, obtained sole rights to use the image of the Lincoln Imp on jewellery, in the late 19th century, a venture which contributed greatly to his fame and wealth.

Lincoln City Football Club are nicknamed 'The Imps'. An image of the Lincoln Imp appears on their crest, and 'Poacher the Imp' serves as club mascot. The Lincoln Imp also lends its name to the Gibraltar club Lincoln Red Imps F.C., and Lincoln Hockey Club share the nickname and crest design of their footballing counterparts.

The Lincoln Imp is the badge of No. LXI Squadron RAF.

The Imp is also found in the Squadron Badge of the RAF 2503 Squadron.

See also 
Cerne Abbas Giant
Green Man
Lincoln Cathedral

References

Imp
Imp
Lincolnshire folklore